Alex Woolf  (born 12 July 1963) is a British medieval historian and academic. He specialises in the history of Britain and Ireland and to a lesser extent Scandinavia in the Early Middle Ages, with a particular emphasis on interaction and comparison across traditional ethnic boundaries. He is a senior lecturer at the University of St Andrews.

He is author of volume two in the New Edinburgh History of Scotland, covering the period between 789 and 1070. For this he won the 2008 Saltire Society award for "history book of the year".

He is the younger brother of the ancient historian Greg Woolf.

Academic career
In 1995, Woolf was appointed a lecturer in archaeology at the University of Wales, Lampeter. From 1997 to 2001, he was a lecturer in Celtic and early Scottish history and culture at the University of Edinburgh. In 2001, he moved to the University of St Andrews as a lecturer in history: he was later promoted to senior lecturer.

Selected works
 "Caedualla Rex Brettonum and the passing of the Old North", Northern History 41.1, 1-20 (2004)
 
 
 "Dun Nechtain, Fortriu and the Geography of the Picts"; Scottish Historical Review 2006 ; 85(2): 182-201
 "The expulsion of the Irish from Dyfed"; Ireland and Wales in the Middle Ages; Karen Jankulak, Jonathan Wooding (ed); Four Courts Press 2007; 102-115

References

External links
 Staff Profile at UoStA
 Saltire Society
 Academia.edu profile

Celtic studies scholars
Academics of the University of St Andrews
British medievalists
English historians
Living people
21st-century British writers
21st-century British historians
Fellows of the Society of Antiquaries of Scotland
Academics of the University of Wales, Lampeter
Academics of the University of Edinburgh
1963 births